Maurice Clinton Hinton Barber,   (born 8 August 1912, date of death unknown) was a South African lieutenant colonel in the South African Air Force during World War II. He was born in Craddock. Barber served during World War II in the Squadron 250 of the RAF on the Western front in 1942. He went on to command Squadron 450 / RAAF November 1942 until March 1943. Although it was considered to have achieved 5 wins, it seems that this total is only 3. He received a DFC in February 1943 and was transferred to the SAAF with the rank of lieutenant colonel. After the war, he became the Federal Director of Civil Aviation in Southern Rhodesia.

Awards

Distinguished Flying Cross on 23 February 1943 as Acting Squadron Leader of the No. 450 (RAAF) Squadron, Royal Air Force

Distinguished Flying Cross citation
Barber's official DFC citation says:
During operations in the Western Desert this officer displayed great skill and unflagging devotion to duty. As flight and squadron commander his steady judgment and high morale proved a tower of strength. In 1 flight during the battle of El Alamein, Squadron Leader Barber destroyed 3 Junkers 87's. His example has been worthy of high praise.

References

External links
http://www.cieldegloire.com/017_barber_m_c_h.php
TracesOfWar.com

1912 births
Year of death missing
South African military personnel of World War II
Recipients of the Distinguished Flying Cross (United Kingdom)